Jacob Francis Mudenda is the current Speaker of the National Assembly of Zimbabwe and a member of the Zimbabwe African National Union - Patriotic Front (ZANU-PF). A longtime schoolteacher and lawyer, Mudenda joined the Zimbabwe political scene after it gained independence from the British in 1980. Mudenda is well known for his relationship with former Zimbabwe president, Robert Mugabe, along with the rise and fall of his political career after the Willowgate scandal.

Background 
Jacob Francis Mudenda was born in Zimbabwe in 1949. Mudenda earned numerous degrees before joining the workforce. Mudenda earned a Bachelor of Arts degree from the University of South Africa while majoring in English and education. He followed this degree by achieving his Bachelor of Laws honour degree from the University of Zimbabwe. In addition, he went back to school a third time to receive a Postgraduate Diploma in Law from the University of Zimbabwe. After gaining his second diploma from the University of Zimbabwe, Mudenda went on to practice law and teach in Zimbabwe until his decision to enter politics.

Early political career 
Upon independence in 1980 from British control, Mudenda was selected by the Mugabe government regime as a district administrator. Through connections to Mugabe personally and good results, Mudenda was soon promoted to provincial administrator and provincial governor. In 1984, after continued success in politics, Mudenda was named resident minister for the government when the position was created. The appointment left Mudenda in charge of the Matabeleland North Province. The new position, as spokesperson for Matabeleland North, the second most populous province in Zimbabwe, continued Mudenda's rise in Mugabe's circle. While holding this position, Mudenda, Mugabe and Zimbabwe as a nation took significant fire for the incident known as Gukurahundi. The incident, from early 1983 to late 1987 left over 20,000 individuals dead, and Mudenda is considered to have been Mugabe's line of contact through the period.

Willowgate scandal and aftermath 

In the late 1980s, Mudenda, along with other members of the Zimbabwe government, were implicated in a scandal involving the illegal sales of cars. Mudenda, along with the other individuals involved, purchased vehicles from a legal importer in Willowvale at a low rate and would sell the vehicles at a highly inflated price. Mugabe, and many other politicians were involved in the investigation. Mudenda was found to have made more than 100,000 Zimbabwe dollars ($51,000) in the purchase and resale of one vehicle. The scandal ended the political careers of many individuals, including Maurice Nyagumbo. Mudenda, however, was able to make his way back into politics after years away from serving as a government official. In his time away from politics, Mudenda spent significant time establishing his law firm. The firm, Mudenda Attorneys Legal Practitioners, still practices in Bulawayo today.

Return to politics 
In February, 2013 Mudenda stepped back into the public sphere with his appointment as the chairman of the Zimbabwe Human Rights Commission (ZHRC). The return to politics did not come without controversy. Some in Zimbabwe felt that Mudenda's appointment did not follow constitutional procedures. Mudenda's appointment lasted only a short period of time, however, as he was elected the Speaker of the House on July 31 of the same year. On September 3, 2013 Mudenda took his position replacing former Speaker, Lovemore Moyo Mudenda has remained in the same position since his appointment in 2013.

See also
List of speakers of the National Assembly of Zimbabwe

References 

1949 births
Living people
20th-century Zimbabwean politicians
21st-century Zimbabwean politicians
Speakers of the National Assembly of Zimbabwe
ZANU–PF politicians
20th-century Zimbabwean lawyers
Zimbabwean educators
Provincial governors of Zimbabwe
University of South Africa alumni
University of Zimbabwe alumni
Members of the National Assembly of Zimbabwe